Ctenicera is a genus of click beetles.

European species 
European species within this genus include: 
Ctenicera bonomii Binaghi, 1940 
Ctenicera bosnica (Apfelbeck, 1894) 
Ctenicera cuprea (Fabricius, 1775) 
Ctenicera doderoi Binaghi, 1940 
Ctenicera heyeri (Saxesen, 1838) 
Ctenicera kiesenwetteri (Brisout, 1866) 
Ctenicera pectinicornis (Linnaeus, 1758) 
Ctenicera schneebergi Roubal, 1932 
Ctenicera virens (Schrank, 1781)

Other selected species 

Ctenicera africanus (Schwarz, 1905)
Ctenicera agriotoides (Sharp, 1877) 
Ctenicera antipodum (Candèze, 1863) 
Ctenicera aphrodite Szombathy, 1910 
Ctenicera aplastoides (Van Dyke, 1932) 
Ctenicera approximans Broun, 1912 
Ctenicera canaliculata Fairmaire, 1885 
Ctenicera currax Van Zwaluwenburg, 1963 
Ctenicera diversicolor (Eschscholtz, 1829)  
Ctenicera dubia (Sharp, 1877) 
Ctenicera euprepes (Zhang Junfeng, 1994) 
Ctenicera fulvescens Broun, 1912 
Ctenicera indentata Punam & Saini, 1996 
Ctenicera irregularis (Sharp, 1886) 
Ctenicera magnicollis (Fleutiaux, 1918) 
Ctenicera megops (White, 1874) 
Ctenicera misella (Boheman, 1851) 
Ctenicera moerens (LeConte, 1866) 
Ctenicera munda (Sharp, 1886) 
Ctenicera munroi (Broun, 1893) 
Ctenicera olivascens (White, 1874) 
Ctenicera philippii Fleutiaux, 1901 
Ctenicera rugosa (Fleutiaux, 1918) 
Ctenicera sincera (Zhang Junfeng, 1994) 
Ctenicera sjaelandica Dietrich, 1945
Ctenicera sternalis Broun, 1912 
Ctenicera strangulata (White, 1874) 
Ctenicera subnitida (Fleutiaux, 1918) 
Ctenicera subnivosa Vats & Chauhan, 1992 
Ctenicera tarsalis (Melsheimer, 1844) 
Ctenicera vitticollis Broun, 1912 
Ctenicera xanthoma (Horn, 1871)

See also 
 List of click beetles of India

References

External links 
 
 

Elateridae genera